Swing, Waltz, Swing is an album by Carl Drevo and the Kenny Clarke/Francy Boland Big Band featuring performances recorded in Germany in 1966 for the German Philips label. The album features big band interpretations of classical waltzes interspersed with jazz standards and original compositions.

Track listing
 "Frühlingsstimmen" Opus 410 (Johann Strauss) - 3:00
 "My Favourite Things" (Richard Rodgers, Lorenz Hart) - 3:17
 "Schön ist die Welt" (Franz Lehár) - 2:38
 "Wives and Lovers" (Burt Bacharach, Hal David) - 2:26
 "Rosenkavalier" Opus 59 (Richard Strauss) - 3:12
 "Claudia" (Karl Drewo) - 2:28
 "By Strauss" (George Gershwin) - 3:49
 "Kaiserwalzer" (Johann Strauss) - 3:25
 "Just Give Me Time" (Francy Boland) - 3:14
 "Keep On Keeping On" (Jimmy Woode) - 2:48

Personnel 
Kenny Clarke - drums
Francy Boland - piano, arranger
Benny Bailey, Jimmy Deuchar, Dusko Gojkovic, Shake Keane - trumpet
Nat Peck, Åke Persson - trombone
Derek Humble - alto saxophone 
Carl Drevo, Sal Nistico - tenor saxophone 
Sahib Shihab - baritone saxophone, flute
Jimmy Woode - bass
Fats Sadi - percussion
Bora Roković - arranger

References 

1966 albums
Kenny Clarke/Francy Boland Big Band albums
Philips Records albums